Love Somebody may refer to:

 Love Somebody (album), a 2015 album by Reba McEntire
 Love Somebody (EP), a 2014 EP by Charmaine
 "Love Somebody" (Noiseworks song), 1987
 "Love Somebody" (Maroon 5 song), 2013
 "Love Somebody" (1947 song), a song by Doris Day released in 1947
 "Love Somebody" (Rick Springfield song), 1984
 "Love Somebody", a song by Robbie Williams, taken from his fifth album Escapology
 "Love Somebody", a song by Backstreet Boys from In a World Like This

See also
Love Someone (disambiguation)
To Love Somebody (disambiguation)
Somebody to Love (disambiguation)